Marathon is a studio album by Saga, their fifteenth album of new material. It is the final album to feature original drummer Steve Negus.

Track listing

The Chapters
Three of the songs, "Streets of Gold (Chapter 14)", "You Know I Know (Chapter 12)" and "Worlds Apart (Chapter 16)," were the last part of a second series of eight songs that Saga included within some of their albums called "The Chapters," which told the story of a young Albert Einstein. These songs were included on The Chapters Live, an album that the band released in 2005.

Personnel 
 Ian Crichton: Guitar & Background Vocals
 Jim Gilmour: Lead Keyboards & Vocals
 Steve Negus: Drums & Percussion
 Michael Sadler: Lead Vocals & Keyboards
 Jim Crichton: Bass & Keyboards

Production 
 Produced by Jim Crichton
 Engineered by Jim Crichton
 Assistant Engineers – Steve Negus, Ian Crichton and Jim Gilmour
 Mixed by Jim Crichton. Assisted by Michael Sadler
 Mastered by Brian Foraker
 Artwork by Eric Fulghum

References 

2003 albums
Saga (band) albums
SPV/Steamhammer albums